The Ronald Reagan Monument was erected to honor the 40th President of the United States and his role in supporting the Polish anti-communist labour union Solidarity. The monument faces the U.S. Embassy building at Ujazdów Avenue (Aleje Ujazdowskie) in the Śródmieście district of Warsaw, Poland. The monument was unveiled on November 21, 2011, by Lech Wałęsa.

See also
 List of things named after Ronald Reagan
 List of buildings and monuments honoring presidents of the United States in other countries

Monuments and memorials in Warsaw
Warsaw
2011 sculptures
2011 establishments in Poland
Reagan, Ronald
Works about Ronald Reagan
Monuments and memorials to Ronald Reagan
Buildings and monuments honoring American presidents in Poland